Pildralazine (Atensil), also known as propyldazine or propildazine, is an antihypertensive and vasodilator.

Synthesis

The reaction between 3,6-Dichloropyridazine [141-30-0] (1) and 1-(Methylamino)-2-propanol [16667-45-1] (2) gives CID:12237595 (3). Reaction with hydrazine completes the synthesis of Pidralazine (4).

References 

Secondary alcohols
Amines
Antihypertensive agents
Hydrazines
Pyridazines